Fixation in orthopedics is the process by which an injury is rendered immobile. This may be accomplished by internal fixation, using intramedullary rod, Kirschner wire or dynamic compression plate; or by external fixation, using a spanning external fixator, Taylor Spatial Frame or Ilizarov apparatus.

References

Orthopedic surgical procedures